Father John Banister Tabb (March 22, 1845 – November 19, 1909) was an American poet, Roman Catholic priest, and professor of English.

Biography
Tabb was born in Amelia County, Virginia, on March 22, 1845. One of his brothers was William Barksdale Tabb, a lawyer and officer in the Confederate States Army.

A member of one of the state's oldest and wealthiest families, Tabb served on a blockade runner for the Confederacy during the Civil War, and spent eight months in a Union prison camp, where he formed a lifelong friendship with poet Sidney Lanier. Tabb converted to the Roman Catholic Church in 1872, and taught literature at Saint Charles College in Ellicott City, Maryland, in 1878.

Tabb was ordained as a priest in 1884, after which he retained his academic position. Plagued by eye problems his whole life, he continued to teach though he lost his sight completely about a year before his death. He died at Saint Charles College on November 19, 1909.

Father Tabb (as he was commonly known) was widely published in popular and prestigious magazines of the day, including Harper's Monthly, The Atlantic Monthly, and The Cosmopolitan. His books of poetry include Poems (1894), Lyrics (1897), Later Lyrics (1902), and, posthumously, 
Later Poems (1910). He also wrote one prose work, Bone Rules (1897), an English grammar; only one of his sermons has survived, a sermon on the Assumption (August 15, 1894).

English poet Alice Meynell made A Selection from the Verses of John B. Tabb (1906). His biographer, Francis A. Litz, a former student of Tabb's, published previously uncollected poems and previously unpublished poems in Father Tabb: A Study of His Life and Works (1923); Litz also edited a collected edition, The Poetry of Father Tabb (1928).

The Tabb Monument in Amelia County is dedicated to his memory.

Notes

References

Further reading
 Litz, Francis A. Father Tabb: A Study of His Life and Works. (Baltimore: The Johns Hopkins Press, 1923).

External links

Works
 
 
 

Poetry
Poems (1894) (Page Images)
Lyrics (1897)  (Page Images)
Child Verse (1899)  (Page Images)
Later Lyrics (1902) (Page Images)
The Rosary in Rhyme (1904) (Page Images)
Quips and Quiddits (1907) (Page Images)
A Selection from the Verses of John B. Tabb (1906/1910) (Page Images)
Later Poems (1910)  (Page Images)

Prose
Bone Rules (1897) (Page Images)

Biographies
"John Bannister Tabb: The Priest-Poet" 
"Father Tabb: His Life and Work"

Other

"Poetry by John B. Tabb: A Centenary Selection"
Brief review of John B. Tabb's first book of poetry in June 1895 edition of The Bookman (New York)

1845 births
1909 deaths
American male poets
Schoolteachers from Maryland
Converts to Roman Catholicism from Anglicanism
People from Ellicott City, Maryland
People from Amelia County, Virginia
19th-century American poets
19th-century American male writers
Poets from Virginia
Poets from Maryland
20th-century American poets
People of Virginia in the American Civil War
20th-century American male writers
Catholics from Virginia
Catholics from Maryland
19th-century American educators
Blockade runners of the Confederate States Navy
19th-century American Roman Catholic priests